Offshore Transmission Owners (OFTOs) operate and maintain electrical transmission assets in the United Kingdom electricity market.  In some cases, they also design and build these assets. In other cases, Generators design and build the electrical transmission assets and then transfer them to OFTOs at construction completion.

In the United Kingdom electricity market different interests are separated, with this practice beginning in the 1980s. The activities of generator, transmission operator, system operator, distribution operator and supplier are separately licensed by Ofgem.

The groundwork was laid by the Energy Act 2004, with the first offshore transmission license being awarded in 2011.  As at 2021 all the OFTO assets in the UK have been built by the wind farm developer, who then is required to sell the transmission assets to a separately licensed Offshore Transmission Owner or OFTO. Developers are required to divest these assets because their generation license forbids them from also owning transmission assets.  The divestment must take place before the Generator Commissioning Clause date, the date on which its exemption from this requirement lapses.

Divestment is managed via a regulated tender process administered by the energy regulator Ofgem.  Qualifying bidders are required to conduct due diligence before submitting a bid to purchase the assets for transfer value determined by Ofgem and receive their bid Tender Revenue Stream (TRS) for a fixed license period. Ofgem then appoints a Preferred Bidder who negotiates the purchase terms with the Developer, after which Ofgem awards a transmission license and the transfer takes place.

OFTO Transactions

Tender Round 7
Triton Knoll OFTO (currently tendering) 
Moray East OFTO (Awaiting tendering)

Tender Round 8
Hornsea Two OFTO (Awaiting tendering)

References

External links
 Offshore Transmission (OFTO) regime, now fully in place, set to achieve further savings
 https://www.4coffshore.com/news/race-bank-ofto-merger-approval-nid11189.html
 https://www.spglobal.com/platts/en/market-insights/latest-news/electric-power/041219-five-bidders-shortlisted-for-uk-offshore-transmission-assets
 https://www.offshorewind.biz/2019/04/12/five-remain-in-gbp-2-7-billion-ofto-race-in-uk/

Energy companies